Sudamdih is a railway station on the Railways in Jharia Coalfield, just north of the Damodar and links to , south of the Damodar, and on the Adra–Netaji S.C.Bose Gomoh branch line. It is located in Dhanbad district in the Indian state of Jharkhand. It serves Sudamdih, Sudamdih colliery and Sudamdih washery.

History

The East Indian Railway Company  extended the Grand Chord to Katrasgarh via Dhanbad in 1894.

The Bengal Nagpur Railway extended its then mainline, the Nagpur–Asansol  line, to Netaji S.C.Bose Gomoh, on East Indian Railway's main line, in 1907. The Mohuda–Chandrapura branch line was opened in 1913.

Electrification
The Santaldih–Pathardih–Sudamdih–Jamadoba sector was electrified in 1965–66.

Passenger movement
Sudamdih railway station serves around 15,000 passengers every day.

References

External links
 Trains at Sudamdih

Railway stations in Dhanbad district
Adra railway division